Al Abraq is a town in Libya, in the Derna District. It is located 23 km east of Bayda, Other names include the transliterations Al Labrag, Al Labraq, Al Lazraq, and El-Abràgh, as well as the Italian Luigi di Savoia. According to the census of 2006, the city had a population of 8861 people.

Transport
The La Abraq Airport (IATA code LAQ), which services the city of Bayda, is located 16 km west of the town of Al Abraq.

References

See also 
 List of cities in Libya

Populated places in Derna District
Baladiyat of Libya